Ambeghar (Balapur) is a village in the Palghar district of Maharashtra, India. It is located in the Vikramgad taluka.

The Ambeghar panchayat administers the following habitations: Ambeghar, Jadhavpada, Jambhulpada (5-gharpada), Tandelpada and Tumbadpada.

Demographics 

According to the 2011 census of India, Ambeghar (Balapur) has 276 households. The effective literacy rate (i.e. the literacy rate of population excluding children aged 6 and below) is 59.47%.

References 

Villages in Vikramgad taluka